Miguel Luque Ávila (born 21 September 1976 in Granollers, Barcelona) is a Spanish swimmer.

Personal 
Luque was born on September 21, 1976, in Granollers, Barcelona. He has a physical disability. In 2013, he was awarded the silver Real Orden al Mérito Deportivo.

Swimming 
Luque is an S5 type swimmer.  One of the reasons he competes in swimming is for the therapeutic benefits. He is affiliated with the Spanish Federation of Sports for the Physically Disabled (FEDDF).

Luque raced at the 2000 Summer Paralympics, earning a gold medal in the SB3 50 meter breaststroke. He raced at the 2004 Summer Paralympics, and finished first in the SB3 50 meter breaststroke. He finished third in the 4 x 50 meter men's 20 point medley relay. In 2007, he competed at the IDM German Open.  He raced at the 2008 Summer Paralympics, winning a bronze in the SB3 50 meter breaststroke. In 2010, he competed at the Tenerife International Open.  He competed at the 2010 Adapted Swimming World Championship in the Netherlands.  In advance of the competition,  he attended a swimming camp with the national team that was part of the Paralympic High Performance Program (HARP Program).  He competed at the 2011 IPC European Swimming Championships in Berlin, Germany where he finished eighth in the  50 meter butterfly.  He finished first in the 50 meter breaststroke.

In 2012, Luque competed at the Paralympic Swimming Championship of Spain by Autonomous Communities, finishing second in the 150 meter freestyle race. From the Catalan region of Spain, he was a recipient of a 2012 Plan ADO scholarship. He competed at the 2012 Summer Paralympics, earning a silver in the SB3 50 meter breaststroke.  After winning the medal, he was not sure if he planned to train for the 2016 Summer Paralympics.  One of the reasons he cited was the competitive level following each Games increased and required greater levels of training in order to stay at the highest level. He competed at the 2013 IPC Swimming World Championships. He was one of fourteen swimmers from the CED San Rafael swimming club to participate in a competition at South Park Rivas Vaciamadrid in December 2013.

References

External links 
 
 

1976 births
Living people
Paralympic swimmers of Spain
Paralympic bronze medalists for Spain
Paralympic gold medalists for Spain
Paralympic silver medalists for Spain
Paralympic medalists in swimming
Swimmers at the 2000 Summer Paralympics
Swimmers at the 2008 Summer Paralympics
Swimmers at the 2004 Summer Paralympics
Swimmers at the 2012 Summer Paralympics
Swimmers at the 2016 Summer Paralympics
Medalists at the 2000 Summer Paralympics
Medalists at the 2004 Summer Paralympics
Medalists at the 2008 Summer Paralympics
Medalists at the 2012 Summer Paralympics
Medalists at the 2016 Summer Paralympics
Medalists at the 2020 Summer Paralympics
Medalists at the World Para Swimming Championships
Medalists at the World Para Swimming European Championships
Plan ADOP alumni
Sportspeople from Granollers
Swimmers at the 2020 Summer Paralympics
Spanish male breaststroke swimmers
S5-classified Paralympic swimmers